The Modern Left (LGM), is a centrist political party in France founded in 2007.

The party was founded following the nomination of the former Socialist Party (PS) Senator and Mayor of Mulhouse, Jean-Marie Bockel to the François Fillon government in May 2007. Along with The Progressives of Éric Besson, the Modern Left represented the left wing of the coalition supporting the then-President Nicolas Sarkozy.

The party calls itself social-liberal and supports a social market economy.

In the 2008 local elections, the party obtained around 40 councillors, and Bockel won a narrow re-election in Mulhouse. However, the LGM incumbent in Pau, Yves Uriéta, was defeated.

In the 2009 European Parliament election, the party obtained two MEPs on the lists of the Union for a Popular Movement. Both MEPs sat, like all other UMP MEPs, in the European People's Party Group.

Elected officials

Senators: Daniel Marsin, Jean-Marie Bockel (RDSE)
MEPs: Michèle Striffler, Marielle Gallo (EPP)

Jean-Marie Bockel was Mayor of Mulhouse from 1989 to 2010 and the party claims a number of councillors in various cities throughout the country.

In addition, Bockel is Secretary of State for Justice and Liberties in the Fillon II government.

See also
Politics of France
List of political parties in France

References

External links
Official website

2007 establishments in France
Centrist parties in France
Liberal parties in France
Political parties established in 2007
Political parties of the French Fifth Republic
Social liberal parties